The 1992 Russian Women's Football Championship was the inaugural edition of the premier championship for Russian women's football teams, succeeding the 1991 Soviet Championship. Interros Moscow won the championship with a one-point advantage over CSK VVS Samara. However it was disbanded following the end of the season along with Spartak Moscow, Interlenprom Saint Petersburg, Sturm Petrozavodsk and Sedin-Shiss Krasnodar.

Teams by federal subject
 Interros Moscow, SKIF Malakhovka, Tekstilschik Ramenskoye, Spartak Moscow, SiM Moscow, CSKA Moscow, Snezhana Lyubertsy
 Prometei Saint Petersburg, Interlenprom Saint Petersburg
 CSK VVS Samara
 Sibiryachka Krasnoyarsk
 Volzhanka Chevoksary
 Energiya Voronezh
 Sturm Petrozavodsk

Standings

Top scorers

References

women's
Russian Championship (women's football) seasons
Russia
Russia